HMS Atherstone was a  of the Royal Navy, the third ship to bear the name. Built by Vosper Thornycroft shipbuilders at Woolston, Southampton, it was launched on 1 March 1986 by Amy Jarvis, the wife of Pat Jarvis, CB, the Deputy Controller of the Navy at the Ministry of Defence, and commissioned on 17 January 1987. It was the tenth ship of its class.

Operational history
HMS Atherstone was accepted into service on 28 November 1986 and commissioned at HMNB Portsmouth on 17 January 1987. The ship had a close association with the town of Atherstone, and was latterly part of the 2nd Mine Countermeasure (MCM) Squadron based at Portsmouth.

In December 2015, Atherstone returned from the Persian Gulf after a two-year deployment as part of Operation Telic in the Middle East, in support of coalition operations to promote and maintain peace in the Persian Gulf. It helped to provide assurance to merchant shipping, by conducting mine-countermeasure surveys in the main shipping routes throughout the region. It participated in 2014 IMCMEX.

After spending a period alongside in extended readiness, Atherstone was lifted out of the water into the "Minor War Vessels Centre of Specialisation"; the former shipbuilding hall at HMNB Portsmouth in December 2016 in readiness to enter refit However, in October 2017 it was revealed that the planned refit would not take place and Atherstone would be decommissioned on 14 December 2017.  On 3 June 2020, the stripped down Atherstone was advertised for sale. It was sold to Harland & Wolff with the intention of rebuilding it for non-military use.

References

External links

 

 

Hunt-class mine countermeasures vessels
1986 ships
Ships built in Southampton